For Sale is a 1998 French drama film directed by Laetitia Masson. It was screened in the Un Certain Regard section at the 1998 Cannes Film Festival.

Cast
 Sandrine Kiberlain - France Robert
 Sergio Castellitto - Luigi Primo
 Jean-François Stévenin - Pierre Lindien
 Aurore Clément - Alice
 Chiara Mastroianni - Mireille
 Mireille Perrier - Primo's Ex-Wife
 Samuel Le Bihan - Eric Pacard
 Caroline Baehr - Marie-Pierre Chénu
 Roschdy Zem - The Banker
 Frédéric Pierrot
 Didier Flamand
 Louis-Do de Lencquesaing

References

External links

1998 films
1998 drama films
French drama films
1990s French-language films
Films directed by Laetitia Masson
1990s French films